Sureh Barq (also Romanized as Sūreh Barq; also known as Sorābar, Surabara, and Sūrbāq) is a village in Sanjabad-e Gharbi Rural District, in the Central District of Kowsar County, Ardabil Province, Iran. At the 2006 census, its population was 134, in 34 families.

References 

Tageo

Towns and villages in Kowsar County